Feaster Branch is a stream in Benton County in the U.S. state of Missouri, which drains into the Lake of the Ozarks in South Lindsey Township.

Feaster Branch has the name of a pioneer citizen.

See also
List of rivers of Missouri

References

Rivers of Benton County, Missouri
Rivers of Missouri